The 2003–04 Cupa României was the 66th edition of Romania's most prestigious football cup competition.

The title was won by Dinamo București against Oțelul Galați.

Format
The competition is an annual knockout tournament.

First round proper matches are played on the ground of the lowest ranked team, then from the second round proper the matches are played on a neutral location.

If a match is drawn after 90 minutes, the game goes into extra time, where it works golden goal rule. If the match is still tied, the result is decided by penalty kicks.

In the quarter-finals and semi-finals, each tie is played as a two legs.

From the first edition, the teams from Divizia A entered in competition in sixteen finals, rule which remained till today.

First round proper

|colspan=3 style="background-color:#97DEFF;"|30 September 2003

|-
|colspan=3 style="background-color:#97DEFF;"|1 October 2003

|-
|colspan=3 style="background-color:#97DEFF;"|8 October 2003

|}

Second round proper

|colspan=3 style="background-color:#97DEFF;"|21 October 2003

|-
|colspan=3 style="background-color:#97DEFF;"|22 October 2003

|}

Quarter-finals 
The matches were played on 3 December 2003 and 17 March 2004.

||1–0||1–1 (a.e.t.)
||7–0||2–1
||2–0||0–1
||4–0||1–0
|}

Semi-finals
The matches were played on 7 April and 21 April 2004.

||1–0||0–2
||0–1||0–4
|}

Final

References

External links
 romaniansoccer.ro
 Official site
 The Romanian Cup on the FRF's official site

Cupa României seasons
2003–04 in Romanian football
Romania